Nikolay Dimitrov (born on 15 June 1990) is a Bulgarian former professional footballer and a football manager who currently manages Maritsa Plovdiv.

Career
On 21 June 2017 he joined Third League club Arda Kardzhali but was released in February 2018.  A few days later, he joined Borislav Parvomay.

On 10 June 2018, Dimitrov signed with Maritsa Plovdiv.

External links

References

1990 births
Living people
Footballers from Plovdiv
Bulgarian footballers
Botev Plovdiv players
OFC Sliven 2000 players
FC Haskovo players
PFC Chernomorets Burgas players
PFC Lokomotiv Plovdiv players
FC Oborishte players
FC Arda Kardzhali players
FC Maritsa Plovdiv players
First Professional Football League (Bulgaria) players
Second Professional Football League (Bulgaria) players
Association football defenders